NGC 542 is a spiral galaxy in the constellation Andromeda, which is approximately 215 million light years from the Milky Way. Together with the galaxies NGC 529, NGC 531, and NGC 536, it forms the Hickson Compact Group 10, abbreviated HCG 10. It was discovered by Irish astronomer R.J. Mitchell in 1885.

See also 
 List of NGC objects (1–1000)

References

External links 
 

Spiral galaxies
0542
Andromeda (constellation)
005360